Michela Fanini (23 March 1973 – 16 October 1994) was a racing cyclist from Italy. Born in Lucca, her biggest achievements were winning the 1994 Giro d'Italia Femminile and the national title at the Italian National Road Race Championships (1992). Fanini died in 1994 at age 21 in a car accident in Capannori, Tuscany.

See also

References

External links

1973 births
1994 deaths
Italian female cyclists
Sportspeople from Lucca
Road incident deaths in Italy
Cyclists from Tuscany
20th-century Italian women